Pollex paramaxima is a moth of the family Erebidae first described by Michael Fibiger in 2007. It is known from central Lombok in Indonesia.

The wingspan is about 12 mm. The forewing is narrow and light brown, with the costa blackish brown in the medial area. The hindwing is unicolorous grey brown with an indistinct black discal spot and the underside unicolorous grey brown.

References

Micronoctuini
Taxa named by Michael Fibiger
Moths described in 2007